Wilton Mountain, in Ouachita National Forest, is a summit in the Ouachita Mountains in Le Flore County, Oklahoma, approximately  from U.S. Route 59 and approximately  west of the Arkansas state line.

References

Landforms of Le Flore County, Oklahoma
Mountains of Oklahoma